Guélengdeng is a city in the Mayo-Kebbi Est Region, Chad. It is the administrative center of Mayo Lemie.

Population
Population by years:

References

Populated places in Chad